Rainforest Films was a film production company founded in 1994 by Rob Hardy and Will Packer that produced films geared towards African-Americans.

History

With fraternity brothers William Packer and Gregory Anderson producing, Rob Hardy wrote and directed Chocolate City, a $20,000 film that Blockbuster distributed through its video stores. The film about a young man's profound experience on a black college campus, was shot using 16mm color film on the campus of Florida A&M University in Tallahassee, Florida. In 1994, on the eve of the success of Chocolate City, Hardy and Packer created Rainforest Films. One of the most important goals of Rainforest Films is to create work that will uplift, instead of degrade, the African-American spirit.

After relocating from Tallahassee to Atlanta, Georgia, the company produced the erotic thriller Trois in 2000. Funded, produced and distributed independently, Trois became the fastest black indie film to ever surpass the $1 million mark at the box office.  With this achievement, Rainforest Films landed at the #34 spot of The Hollywood Reporter’s Top 500 Film Distributors of 2000, and resulted in Trois being named one of Daily Variety’s Top 50 Highest Grossing Independent Films of the Year.

In 2002, Rainforest Films released the critically acclaimed motion picture Pandora’s Box at the American Black Film Festival. Later that year, The Hollywood Reporter listed Rob Hardy and William Packer amongst the New Establishment of Black Power Brokers in Hollywood. Rainforest Films acquired the US distribution rights to Master P’s gritty prison drama Lockdown in 2003. The film received a limited theatrical run but eventually became one of Columbia TriStar Home Entertainment’s top selling independent releases of the year.

Dissolution of company and lawsuit

In June 2014, Packer and Hardy announced that Rainforest Films was being dissolved that month pursuant to a 68.1% vote by the shareholders of its holding company, Rainforest Productions Holdings, on June 2, 2014. The last Will Packer-produced film that appears under the Rainforest Film's banner is About Last Night. Think Like a Man Too, No Good Deed, The Wedding Ringer and Ride Along 2 (all Will Packer-produced films that were filming or in post-production at the time of Rainforest Films dissolution) will fall under the new shingle Will Packer Productions.

On June 20, 2014, Bronner Bros. president and CEO Bernard Bronner, who owns 30.8% of the Rainforest Productions Holdings and voted against the dissolution of Rainforest Films, filed a lawsuit against the holding company and co founders Will Packer and Rob Hardy alleging, inter alia, breaches of fiduciary duty, gross mismanagement, misappropriation of corporate assets, waste of corporate assets and abuse of control. Bronner states in the suit that he invested over $500,000 and raised another $250,000 to start Rainforest Films back in 2000 and was one-third owner of the company. Bronner claims he was systematically shut out of Rainforest by Hardy and Packer, who assumed daily operations of the company, limited information Bronner received about the company as well as limited Bronner's decision-making authority. Bronner, who is demanding a trial by jury, is seeking judgement against Hardy and Packer for the allegations as well as an award of punitive damages.
Rainforest Productions Holdings has described Bronner's lawsuit as frivolous, and said that the lawsuit has been sent to its lawyers for vigorous defense and potential countersuit against Bronner in light of the scurrilous nature of Bronner's allegations.  Rainforest Productions Holdings and Hardy and Packer are not presently commenting further on the Bronner lawsuit.

Movies produced by Rainforest Films

Theatrical releases

Direct-to-Video releases

 Chocolate City (1994)
 Motives (2004)
 Trois: The Escort (2004)
 The Gospel Live (2005)
 Puff, Puff, Pass (2006)
 Motives 2: Retribution (2007)
 Three Can Play That Game (2008)
 Stomp the Yard: Homecoming (2010)

References

External links
 

Mass media companies established in 1994
Mass media companies disestablished in 2014
Film production companies of the United States